Owain Williams is the leader of Llais Gwynedd, a regionalist political party in Gwynedd, north Wales, and councillor representing the Clynnog Fawr ward for Gwynedd Council.

He is a fervent nationalist committed to an independent Wales. In the 1960s, he was imprisoned twice for bombing the site of the future Llyn Celyn reservoir but later turned to the democratic route, becoming the chairman of the Independent Wales Party as well as a member of, at different times, both the Welsh Labour Party and Plaid Cymru. In May 2008 he was elected chairman of Llais Gwynedd after their emergence following the 2008 Welsh local elections. In the summer of 2009, he was reported to the authorities for leaving the bodies of several dead sheep to rot in his fields.

Williams' story inspired the 2021 film The Welshman. The film was nominated for a BAFTA Cymru award. He also wrote an autobiography, entitled Tryweryn: A Nation Awakes.

References

Councillors in Wales
Living people
Year of birth missing (living people)
Llais Gwynedd politicians
Leaders of political parties in Wales